"I Belong to You"  is a song by American singer Toni Braxton. It was written by Vassal Benford and Ronald Spearman for her eponymous debut studio album (1993), while production was helmed by the former. The song was released as the album's fifth and final single on June 10, 1994 by LaFace and Arista Records, a double A side along with "How Many Ways." While there was no accompanying music video for "I Belong to You", the song garnered Braxton a nomination for Best Female R&B Vocal Performance at the 1996 Grammy Awards. It peaked at number 28 on the Billboard Hot 100 on January 21, 1995.

Track listings
US double A-side CD/cassette single
"I Belong to You" (Rollerskate Radio Mix) – 4:21
"I Belong to You" (Soulpower Mix w/o Rap) – 5:41
"I Belong to You" (Album Version) – 3:53
"How Many Ways" (R. Kelly Remix Extended - No Talk) – 5:46
"How Many Ways" (Album Version) – 4:45
"How Many Ways" (The VH1 Mix) – 4:17

US 12-inch maxi single ("How Many Ways/I Belong to You")
"How Many Ways" (R. Kelly Remix, Extended w/ Rap) – 5:46
"How Many Ways" (Bad Boy Remix, Extended Mix) – 7:02
"How Many Ways" (Bad Boy Instrumental) – 6:53
"I Belong to You" (Rollerskate Radio Mix) – 4:21
"I Belong to You" (Soulpower Mix w/o Rap) – 5:41
"I Belong to You" (Soulpower Instrumental) – 5:57

US promotional CD single ("I Belong to You")
"I Belong to You" (Rollerskate Radio Mix) – 4:21
"I Belong to You" (Soulpower Mix W/O Rap) – 5:41
"I Belong to You" (Album Version) – 3:53
"The Christmas Song" – 3:25

Credits and personnel
Credits lifted from Toni Braxtons liner notes.

 Vassal Benford – production, writing
 Toni Braxton – vocals
 Valerie Davis – backing vocals 

 Victor Flores – mixing, recording
 Chris Gehringer – mastering
 Ronald Spearman – writing

Charts

Weekly charts

Year-end charts

References

1993 songs
1994 singles
LaFace Records singles
Arista Records singles
Songs written by Ronald Spearman
Songs written by Vassal Benford
Toni Braxton songs